The 2021 Euro Super Series was a curling event among various countries of Europe. It was held from 31 August to 5 September at the National Curling Academy in Stirling, Scotland. It was the first international competition hosted by the club, which serves as the home club for the top British curlers. The total purse for the event was GBP 6,000 on both the men's and women's sides.

Team Yannick Schwaller of Bern, Switzerland won the men's event, defeating the Scottish rink of Ross Whyte from Stirling 5–4 in the final. In a tie game after six ends, Schwaller took a pivotal two points in the seventh, with Whyte only able to reply with one in the eighth and final end. It was Team Schwaller's second win of the 2021–22 curling season, as they had won the 2021 Baden Masters the week before. To reach the final, Schwaller went 4–1 through the round robin, only suffering a loss to Team Whyte. They then topped Bruce Mouat 8–2 in the quarterfinals and bested undefeated Joël Retornaz 5–4 in the semifinals. Whyte also finished 4–1 in the round robin, however, earned a direct berth to the semifinals thanks to their head-to-head victory against Schwaller. In their semifinal matchup, they defeated Peter de Cruz 7–5.

On the women's side of the draw, Team GB Red, consisting of Rebecca Morrison, Lauren Gray, Jennifer Dodds and Mili Smith defeated Team Isabella Wranå 7–2 in the final to claim the title. With the Olympics looming and Team Eve Muirhead not securing an Olympic spot at the 2021 World Women's Curling Championship, British Curling decided to create a nine-player team that would play in various lineups for the 2021–22 season before they selected who would represent Great Britain at the Olympic Qualification Event in December 2021. Both British teams showed promise, with the GB Blue team of Eve Muirhead, Gina Aitken, Vicky Wright, Sophie Sinclair and alternate Hailey Duff going 5–0 through the round robin before dropping their semifinal to Sweden's Wranå. GB Red finished the round robin with a 3–2 record, third in their pool. They beat the defending world champions Silvana Tirinzoni 6–3 in the quarterfinals and then defeated Daniela Jentsch 7–4 in the semifinals.

Men

Teams
The teams are listed as follows:

Round-robin standings 
Final round-robin standings

Round-robin results 
All draw times are listed in British Summer Time (UTC+01:00).

Draw 1
Tuesday, 31 August, 8:30 am

Draw 2
Tuesday, 31 August, 12:30 pm

Draw 3
Tuesday, 31 August, 4:30 pm

Draw 4
Tuesday, 31 August, 8:30 pm

Draw 5
Wednesday, 1 September, 8:30 am

Draw 6
Wednesday, 1 September, 12:30 pm

Draw 7
Wednesday, 1 September, 4:30 pm

Draw 8
Wednesday, 1 September, 8:30 pm

Draw 9
Thursday, 2 September, 8:30 am

Draw 10
Thursday, 2 September, 12:30 pm

Draw 11
Thursday, 2 September, 4:30 pm

Draw 12
Thursday, 2 September, 8:30 pm

Draw 13
Friday, 3 September, 8:30 am

Draw 14
Friday, 3 September, 12:30 pm

Draw 15
Friday, 3 September, 4:30 pm

Draw 16
Friday, 3 September, 8:30 pm

Playoffs

Quarterfinals
Saturday, 4 September 9:00 am

Semifinals
Saturday, 4 September, 1:30 pm

Final
Sunday, 5 September, 9:00 am

Women

Teams
The teams are listed as follows:

Round-robin standings 
Final round-robin standings

Round-robin results 
All draw times are listed in British Summer Time (UTC+01:00).

Draw 1
Tuesday, 31 August, 8:30 am

Draw 2
Tuesday, 31 August, 12:30 pm

Draw 3
Tuesday, 31 August, 4:30 pm

Draw 4
Tuesday, 31 August, 8:30 pm

Draw 5
Wednesday, 1 September, 8:30 am

Draw 6
Wednesday, 1 September, 12:30 pm

Draw 7
Wednesday, 1 September, 4:30 pm

Draw 8
Wednesday, 1 September, 8:30 pm

Draw 9
Thursday, 2 September, 8:30 am

Draw 10
Thursday, 2 September, 12:30 pm

Draw 11
Thursday, 2 September, 4:30 pm

Draw 12
Thursday, 2 September, 8:30 pm

Draw 13
Friday, 3 September, 8:30 am

Draw 14
Friday, 3 September, 12:30 pm

Draw 15
Friday, 3 September, 4:30 pm

Draw 16
Friday, 3 September, 8:30 pm

Playoffs

Quarterfinals
Saturday, 4 September, 9:00 am

Semifinals
Saturday, 4 September, 5:30 pm

Final
Sunday, 5 September, 9:00 am

Notes

References

External links
Men's Event
Women's Event

2021 in curling
2021 in Scottish sport
International curling competitions hosted by Scotland
Stirling (city)
August 2021 sports events in the United Kingdom
September 2021 sports events in the United Kingdom